The AN/PAS-13B Thermal Weapon Sight (TWS) is an infrared sight developed for the United States military by Raytheon.  The sight is designed for use on small arms in the U.S. military's inventory, but it can also be used as a standalone observation device.  The AN/PAS-13B uses thermal imaging so that it can be used day or night. Thermal imaging also allows the sight to see through smoke or fog, things that may normally obscure other night vision devices.  The AN/PAS-13 first became operationally capable with the U.S. Army in 1998 and has reached a total production of 33,400 units.

Design and features 

Due to the use of thermal imaging, the AN/PAS-13B does not require low levels of light to operate, and it will not shut off like most night vision if hit directly by light.  The thermal imaging sensor within the sight requires a low temperature to operate, so a cool-down time of less than 2 minutes is required at startup. The AN/PAS-13B comes in two variants, the Medium AN/PAS-13B(V)1 and the Heavy AN/PAS-13B(V)2. The Medium has a smaller telescope attached, resulting in a zoom of 5x compared to the Heavy's 10x.  Both AN/PAS-13Bs have programmable reticles, allowing the user to match the reticle to the weapon system the sight will be mounted on.  Some reticles included in the sight include those designed for the M16 Rifle, M4 Carbine, M60 Machine Gun, M240 Machine Gun, M249, M2 Machine Gun, MK19, MK47, M24 Sniper Weapon System, and the GAU-21.  The sight also has a multi-function I/O port, allowing for video to be recorded or viewed from a location other than the eyepiece.  When using the eyepiece, the rubber cup surrounding the eyepiece must be depressed slightly to engage the display and cooling mechanism.  The image displayed for the user is black and white.  The user has the ability to select whether white or black will represent hotter objects by selecting "black hot" or "white hot".  AN/PAS-13Bs are powered by standard military disposable or rechargeable lithium-ion batteries.

New versions 

In November 2006, three new versions of the AN/PAS-13 were ordered by the U.S. military.  The Thermal Weapon Sights II include three new versions, a Light, Medium, and Heavy.  All three models weigh less than the originals, weighing 1.8 lbs, 2.8 lbs, and 3.9 lbs respectively.  This reduction in weight and size is due to improvements in the sensors, as well as the ability to now run the sights without being cooled.  The Medium and Heavy models maintain zooms of 5× and 10×, while the Light model has a zoom of 1.55× and a FOV of 15 degrees.  All three models now run on lithium AA batteries, with the Light having a battery life of 5 hours, the Medium 6.5, and the Heavy 6.5. The US Armed Forces designates version 2 as MTWS (Medium Thermal Weapon Sight), and version 3 as HTWS (Heavy Thermal Weapon Sight).

A new variation, the AN/PAS-13G LWTS model, is much smaller and compact making it easier to use on the M16/M4 family of rifles. It is also designed to be used with the ACOG, and M68 Close Combat Optic.

References 

Raytheon Company products